Katharine "Kitty" Dukakis (née Dickson; born December 26, 1936) is an American author. She is the wife of former Massachusetts governor Michael Dukakis.

Life and career

Dukakis was born Katharine Virginia Dickson in Cambridge, Massachusetts, the daughter of Jane (née Goldberg) and Harry Ellis Dickson. Her paternal grandparents were Russian Jews; her mother was born to an Irish Catholic father and a Hungarian Jewish mother, and had been adopted by a family of German Jewish descent. Her father was a member of the first violin section of the Boston Symphony Orchestra for 49 years and also served as Associate Conductor of the Boston Pops Orchestra. 

She graduated from Brookline High School in 1954 and attended Pennsylvania State University.  She dropped out of college in 1956 and married John Chaffetz in 1957. They had one son, John. After four years and several moves the marriage ended in divorce, and she returned to Cambridge. Her former husband later remarried and had a son, Jason Chaffetz, who was a Republican Congressman from Utah. Kitty received her B.A. from Lesley College in 1963, the same year she married Michael Dukakis. She received a M.A. degree from Boston University College of Communication in 1982.

During the 1988 presidential election, several false rumors were reported in the media about the Dukakises, including the claim by Idaho Republican Senator Steve Symms that Kitty had burned an American flag to protest the Vietnam War. Republican strategist Lee Atwater was accused of having initiated these rumors.

In 1989, Dukakis was briefly hospitalized after drinking rubbing alcohol. In 1991, Dukakis published her memoir, Now You Know, in which she candidly discussed her ongoing battle with alcoholism. The book also discussed the pressures of being a political wife and her disappointment over her husband's defeat in the 1988 election. In the mid-1990s, Dukakis graduated from the Boston University School of Social Work with a master's degree in Social Work, successfully performing her practicum at Charles River Hospital in Wellesley, Massachusetts. In 2006, her book Shock revealed that she had undergone electroconvulsive therapy treatment beginning in 2001 in order to treat major depression. Dukakis is a leading proponent of using ECT to treat depression.

In 2007, the Lemuel Shattuck Hospital in Jamaica Plain, Massachusetts, opened a center for addiction treatment named after Dukakis.

Dukakis appears in the 2008 documentary on Lee Atwater, Boogie Man: The Lee Atwater Story.

Published works
 
  Cowritten with Larry Tye.

Public service
Dukakis has served on the President's Commission on the Holocaust, on the United States Holocaust Memorial Council, on the board of the Refugee Policy Center, and on the Task Force on Cambodian Children.

References

External links

"Appointment of Katharine D. Dukakis as a Member of the United States Holocaust Memorial Council 1989-12-19", George Bush Presidential Library and Museum, College Station, Texas. A short profile of her education and career
 Dukakis, Kitty; Tye, Larry, 'I Feel Good, I Feel Alive', Newsweek, September 18, 2006. An article in which she discusses her treatment with electroconvulsive therapy for depression

1936 births
First Ladies and Gentlemen of Massachusetts
American memoirists
Boston University College of Communication alumni
Living people
Writers from Cambridge, Massachusetts
American people of Russian-Jewish descent
American people of Hungarian-Jewish descent
American people of Irish descent
Lesley University alumni
Dukakis family
Massachusetts Democrats
Boston University School of Social Work alumni